The Duchy of Nivernais was a duchy in France, centred around the city of Nevers, of which the duchy took its name.

History
In 1539, it was directly annexed to France and became a duchy in the peerage of France. For a time, it was held by a cadet branch of the House of Gonzaga. This branch inherited the Duchy of Mantua from the senior Gonzaga line (when it became extinct in 1627) and ruled Mantua until 1708, when the branch died out in the male line.  Charles IV Gonzaga sold the duchies of Nevers and Rethel in 1659 to Cardinal Mazarin. His family held the duchy of Nevers until the French Revolution.

In 1659, when the Mazarin family took control of the duchy, the region was reduced to become a province of the Kingdom of France, thus becoming the Province of Nevers. However, according to the laws of the peerage of France, the province kept the official title of 'Duchy of Nivernais', though it held the status of province of the Kingdom.

Following the Decree dividing France into departments in 1790, the province was broken up into three new departments: Nièvre (forming the main part), Yonne (northernmost parts), and Cher (south eastern most parts).

Government 

Following the governmental reforms of 1773, the Duchy of Nevers formed part of the Military Government of Nivers (Gouvernement de Nivernais).  For the Department of Finances, the duchy was divided into four election counties: Nevers and Château-Chinon part of the Generality of Moulins, Clamecy was part of the Generality of Orléans, and La Charité-sur-Loire part of the Generality of Bourges.  The Judicial Department, the county was part of the powerful Parliament of Paris.

Following the Decree dividing France into departments announced on 22 December 1789, the Duchy of Nevers was disestablished.  The majority of the county formed the new Nièvre (forming the main part), Yonne (northernmost parts), and Cher (south eastern most parts).

Footnotes

External links 

Nivernais
History of Auvergne-Rhône-Alpes
History of Bourgogne-Franche-Comté
History of Centre-Val de Loire
History of Allier
History of Cher (department)
History of Nièvre
History of Yonne
Former duchies of France